Davisleydi Velazco (born 4 September 1999) is a Cuban athlete who competes in the triple jump. She won bronze at the 2018 IAAF World U20 Championships.

Career
Her jump of 14.34m on 21 March 2020 was the sixth longest jump in the world that year. At the 2020 Summer Games Velazco finished eighth in her heat with a jump of 14.14 metres. She also finished 8th in her qualifying round at the 2022 World Athletics Championships in Eugene, Oregon, jumping 13.94m.

References

Living people
1999 births
Cuban female triple jumpers
Athletes (track and field) at the 2020 Summer Olympics
Olympic athletes of Cuba
Athletes (track and field) at the 2019 Pan American Games
Pan American Games competitors for Cuba
20th-century Cuban women
21st-century Cuban women